Commuter Airlines was a commuter airline based in Binghamton, New York from the 1960s to 1984.

Broome County Aviation

Commuter Airlines began as Broome County Aviation, Inc, owned by Jerry Winston. Winston was not only the owner, he was also one of the pilots. From the beginning in 1957 until the end in 1984 it was a family run airline, owned by Winston. Broome County Aviation, Inc. took over as the fixed-base operator (FBO) at the Broome County Airport in Binghamton, New York in 1957. Winston had negotiated an ironclad 25-year lease on the airport facilities. Initially, they sold fuel, operated a flight school and a charter service. In 1964 Winston, began a scheduled part 135 commuter operation with a Piper Aztec between Binghamton, NY and Washington National Airport in Washington D.C. when Eastern Airlines pulled out of that market. During the next two decades Commuter Airlines expanded to serve Washington D.C., White Plains, LaGuardia and JFK in New York City, Newark, New Jersey, Boston Logan, Massachusetts, Wilkes Barre/Scranton, and Allentown Pennsylvania and Ithaca and Elmira, New York.

Fleet 
The company began with a single Piper Aztec and over the years added de Havilland Doves and Beechcraft Model 18s, (including a unique conversion of the Beechcraft Model 18 called the DuMod conversion. It had 15 seats, a nose wheel, and a triple tail similar to the Lockheed Constellation). Jerry Winston purchased the manufacturing rights to the DuMod conversion but only three Beech 18s were ever converted. Some of the Beech 18s were also used on night mail and freight runs, and the seats were put back in for the passenger flights during the day. Commuter Airlines also operated Piper PA-31 Navajos and Chieftains and operated the first passenger Fairchild Metros in 1972, eventually acquiring four of them. In 1978, with the advent of deregulation, Commuter purchased five Convair 580s from USAir.

Overview

In 1980 Winston entered into an agreement with United Airlines to provide a commuter feeder service to United's Cleveland Hopkins Hub in Ohio.  He decided to operate that under the newly formed corporate entity of Freedom Airlines. The five Convairs were repainted with the Freedom Airlines name and flew from Flint, Saginaw, Grand Rapids, and Lansing Michigan to Cleveland, Ohio. United Airlines terminated the feeder agreement after about a year, but Freedom continued to operate those routes on its own, adding flights from those same Michigan cities to Chicago, O'Hare. Over the next two years a Cleveland, Ohio to Harrisburg and Allentown, Pennsylvania flight was added. In 1982 Winston pulled out of Binghamton, NY, moved the company headquarters to Cleveland, OH, completely, sold off the Piper Navajos, dropped the Commuter Airlines name and repainted the Metroliners in the Freedom Airlines colors. A route from Chicago O'Hare to Escanaba, Iron Mountain, and Ironwood, Michigan was added in 1983 when those cities were dropped by Republic Airlines.

In the summer of 1984, Winston died of cancer and the airline was put up for sale. Air Ontario purchased the Convair 580s in October 1984 and the airline ceased operations and the assets were sold off.

Destinations 
Michigan
Flint
Grand Rapids
Lansing
Saginaw
New Jersey
Newark (Newark International Airport)
New York
Binghamton (Binghamton Regional Airport) - hub
New York (LaGuardia Airport)
White Plains (Westchester County Airport)
Ohio
Cleveland (Cleveland Hopkins International Airport)
Virginia
Washington, D.C. (Reagan National Airport)

See also 
 List of defunct airlines of the United States

References

Defunct regional airlines of the United States
Defunct companies based in New York (state)
Binghamton, New York
Companies based in Binghamton, New York
Defunct airlines of the United States
Airlines based in New York (state)
Airlines established in 1964
Airlines disestablished in 1984